Barbara Bain (born Mildred Fogel; September 13, 1931) is an American actress. She is best known for her role as Cinnamon Carter on the action television series Mission: Impossible (1966–1969), which earned her three Primetime Emmy Awards, as well as a Golden Globe Award nomination. She also starred as Dr. Helena Russell on the British-Italian coproduction science-fiction television series Space: 1999 (1975–1977). Bain has also appeared in the films Animals with the Tollkeeper (1998), Panic (2000), Forget Me Not (2009) and On the Rocks (2020).

Early life 
Bain was born Mildred Fogel in Chicago, Illinois, the daughter of Russian-Jewish immigrants. She graduated from the University of Illinois with a bachelor's degree in sociology. Developing an interest in dance, she moved to New York City, where she studied alongside Martha Graham.  Dissatisfied with her career as a dancer, she went into modeling; jobs with Vogue, Harper's, and other publications followed.

Still uninspired, however, Bain entered the Theater Studio to study acting, first under Curt Conway, then Lonny Chapman. Progressing to the Actors Studio, she was instructed by Lee Strasberg.

Bain's first acting role was in Paddy Chayevsky's play Middle of the Night, which embarked on a national tour in October 1957. Accompanying Bain was fellow actor and new husband Martin Landau; the final leg of the tour brought the couple to Los Angeles, where they settled permanently. After moving, Bain established herself at the Actors Studio West, where she continued to teach classes and perform scene work.

Career 
Bain's earliest television appearances included CBS's Tightrope, with Mike Connors, and three ABC series: The Law and Mr. Jones, Adventures in Paradise, and Straightaway. After a recurring role as David Janssen's romantic interest in Richard Diamond, Private Detective in 1959, she guest-starred as Madelyn Terry in a 1960 episode of Perry Mason, "The Case of the Wary Wildcatter". 

In 1963, Bain appeared as Rob Petrie's soon-to-be ex-fiancee in The Dick Van Dyke Show, in the episode "Will You Two Be My Wife?", and in 1964 played the role of Elayna Scott in "The Case of the Nautical Knot" episode of Perry Mason. In 1965, she guest-starred alongside series star Jerry Van Dyke in an episode of My Mother The Car. She appeared in the 1966 final episode of the series alongside Van Dyke.

Between 1966 and 1969, Bain appeared—alongside her husband, Martin Landau—in the major role of Cinnamon Carter in Mission: Impossible. She won three consecutive Emmy Awards for Best Dramatic Actress for her performances in 1967, 1968, and 1969, in addition to a Golden Globe Award nomination in 1968. Bain reprised her character in a 1997 episode of Diagnosis: Murder. She starred opposite Landau again in the science-fiction TV series Space: 1999 (1975–77), as Dr. Helena Russell, and the made-for-TV film The Harlem Globetrotters on Gilligan's Island (1981). 

She guest-starred in the October 29, 1985, episode of Moonlighting, playing  Emily Greydon. Bain also appeared in My So-Called Life, playing Angela Chase's grandmother in one episode. Other appearances include "Matryoshka", an episode of the 1990s science-fiction series Millennium.

In 1998, Bain appeared in the Walker, Texas Ranger episode "Saving Grace", as the mother superior. In 2006, she had a minor role in one episode of CSI: Crime Scene Investigation ("Living Legends"). In 2008, co-starring with her daughter Juliet Landau, Bain voiced the character of Verdona Tennyson in "What Are Little Girls Made Of?", an episode of Ben 10: Alien Force.

Personal life 
Bain married actor Martin Landau in 1957; they divorced in 1993. They have two daughters, film producer Susan Landau Finch and actress Juliet Landau.

Bain suffers from claustrophobia, which the writers of Mission: Impossible incorporated into her character on the show in the episode "The Exchange".

Filmography

Film

Television

References

External links 
 
 Interview with Barbara Bain, October, 2014, Ames Tribune
 Interview with Barbara Bain at Classic Film & TV Cafe, 5 September 2019
 
 

1931 births
20th-century American actresses
21st-century American actresses
Actresses from Chicago
Actresses from Los Angeles
Female models from Illinois
American film actresses
American people of Russian-Jewish descent
American stage actresses
American television actresses
American voice actresses
Outstanding Performance by a Lead Actress in a Drama Series Primetime Emmy Award winners
Jewish American actresses
Jewish female models
Living people
University of Illinois Urbana-Champaign alumni
Models from Chicago
21st-century American Jews